Washdyke is an industrial suburb in the north of Timaru, in south Canterbury, New Zealand. State Highway 1 passes through Washdyke on the way north out of the city. The northern terminus of State Highway 8 is in Washdyke.

Washdyke is home of Timaru's horse racetrack, "Phar Lap Raceway" - named after champion racehorse Phar Lap, who was foaled here in 1926.

The Main South Line railway passes through Washdyke, and it was formerly the location of a railway junction.  On 18 February 1874, construction began on a branch line to Pleasant Point; this line ultimately became known as the Fairlie Branch when it was opened past Pleasant Point to Fairlie in 1884.  Declining traffic led to the closure of the branch on 2 March 1968 and since then, the Main South Line has been the only railway through Washdyke.  Passenger services through Washdyke ceased on 10 February 2002 with the cancellation of the Southerner express that operated between Christchurch and Invercargill.

Washdyke primary school was implicated in a child sex and pornography scandal mid 1970s that no one has yet been held accountable for.

Slightly south of the suburb is Washdyke Lagoon, a medium-sized tidal lagoon which a variety of wading birds frequent.

Demographics

Washdyke had a population of 1,017 at the 2018 New Zealand census, an increase of 75 people (8.0%) since the 2013 census, and a decrease of 27 people (-2.6%) since the 2006 census. There were 411 households. There were 522 males and 498 females, giving a sex ratio of 1.05 males per female. The median age was 44.6 years (compared with 37.4 years nationally), with 177 people (17.4%) aged under 15 years, 168 (16.5%) aged 15 to 29, 468 (46.0%) aged 30 to 64, and 204 (20.1%) aged 65 or older.

Ethnicities were 90.3% European/Pākehā, 9.7% Māori, 2.7% Pacific peoples, 4.4% Asian, and 1.8% other ethnicities (totals add to more than 100% since people could identify with multiple ethnicities).

The proportion of people born overseas was 10.0%, compared with 27.1% nationally.

Although some people objected to giving their religion, 48.4% had no religion, 38.9% were Christian, 0.6% were Muslim, 0.6% were Buddhist and 3.2% had other religions.

Of those at least 15 years old, 63 (7.5%) people had a bachelor or higher degree, and 237 (28.2%) people had no formal qualifications. The median income was $32,300, compared with $31,800 nationally. The employment status of those at least 15 was that 447 (53.2%) people were employed full-time, 114 (13.6%) were part-time, and 18 (2.1%) were unemployed.

Education
Washdyke School was a primary school which opened in 1874 and was merged with Marchwiel School to form Oceanview Heights School on the Marchwiel site in 2004.

See also
 Washdyke Lagoon

References

Suburbs of Timaru
Populated places in Canterbury, New Zealand